Future Bound is the sixth studio album by American soul/R&B group Tavares, released in 1978 on the Capitol label.

Commercial performance
The album peaked at No. 55 on the R&B albums chart. It also reached No. 115 on the Billboard 200. The album features the singles "More Than a Woman", which peaked at No. 36 on the Hot Soul Singles chart and No. 32 on the Billboard Hot 100, "The Ghost of Love", which peaked at No. 48 on the Hot Soul Singles chart, and "Timber", which reached No. 94 on the Hot Soul Singles chart.

Track listing

Personnel 
James Gadson – drums
Chuck Rainey – bass
Greg Phillinganes – acoustic piano, Fender Rhodes
Bob Bowles, Jim Nau – guitars
Bob Zimmitti, Freddie Perren – percussion
Paulinho da Costa – congas
Freddie Perren – vibraphone, synthesizer, harpsichord

Charts
Album

Singles

References

External links

1978 albums
Tavares (group) albums
Albums produced by Freddie Perren
Capitol Records albums